GCT may refer to:

Medicine 
 Germ cell tumor
 Giant-cell tumor of bone
 Glucose challenge test
 Granulosa cell tumor

Transport 
 Gauge Change Train, a Japanese train
 Ghazipur City railway station, in Uttar Pradesh, India
 Grand Canyon Bar 10 Airport, in Arizona, United States
 Grand Central Terminal, in New York City
 Great Coates railway station in England
 Grimsby-Cleethorpes Transport, former municipal bus company of Grimsby and Cleethorpes, England
 Gwinnett County Transit, in Georgia, United States

Other uses 
 Galapagos Conservation Trust, a British charity
 Genetic coding technologies, a frequently advertised investment area
 Geometric complexity theory
 German Colonial Tovar dialect of German, spoken in Venezuela
 Global Champions Tour, a show jumping series
 Gloucester County Times, a daily newspaper in New Jersey
 Government College of Technology (disambiguation)
 Grand Chess Tour, an annual circuit of chess tournaments
 Grande Cadence de Tir (GCT) 155mm, French self-propelled artillery vehicle
 Green Card Test, used by the United States Internal Revenue Service
 Green Crescent Trust, in Sindh, Pakistan
 Greene County Tech School District, in Greene County, Arkansas, United States
 Greenwood Community Theatre, in South Carolina, United States
 GCT, a codon for the amino acid Alanine